Loup City is the county seat of Sherman County, in the central portion of the Midwestern state of Nebraska, United States. The population was 1,173 at the 2010 census. Loup City is close to the Middle Loup River, and about five miles from Sherman Reservoir.

History
The first settlement at Loup City was made in the mid 1860s. Loup City was platted in 1864, and designated county seat. Loup City was named after the Loup River.

During the Great Depression, Loup City was the site of a clash between radical leftists, influenced by Mother Bloor, who clashed with area residents in June 1934 following efforts by Communists to organize the workers of a poultry processing plant.

The completion of Sherman Reservoir in 1963 added tourism to the area's economic base.

Recreation
Sherman Dam – 2,845-acre lake and 4,721 land acres. Primitive camping includes 360 non-pad sites. Facilities include picnic tables, shelters, water, dumpstation, modern restrooms, vault toilets, four boat ramps, fish cleaning stations, coin-operated showers and concession.

Bowman Recreation Area – Bowman Lake, located one mile west of Loup City, is a 23-acre area lying adjacent to the Loup River and features a 20-acre man made lake.  It offers picnicking, fishing and primitive camping.

Jenners Park – At one time, Jenner's Park was home to amusement rides and a zoo. Today, the park is home to a disc golf course, two picnic shelters, outdoor grills, playground equipment, and an outdoor recreation area.

Loup City Swimming Pool – Newly built in 2000, the Loup City pool has a water slide, diving board, basketball hoop, mushroom, and zero depth entry.

Loup City Golf Course – A 9-hole course located one mile west of Loup City.  The par 36 course has mature trees, a creek, and several ponds.

Petersen Park Ball Fields – Two newly developed baseball fields used for T-ball teams to high school softball teams. The park also includes a playground area for younger children.

Geography
Loup City is located at  (41.277332, -98.968063).

Climate

Demographics

2010 census
As of the census of 2010, there were 1,173 people, 702 households, and 263 families residing in the city. The racial makeup of the city was 98.7% White, 0.1% Native American, 0.4% Asian, 0.2% from other races, and 0.6% from two or more races. Hispanic or Latino of any race were 1.6% of the population.

There were 704 households, of which 88.8% had children under the age of 18 living with them, 57.4% were married couples living together, 0.5% had a female householder with no husband present, 3.0% had a male householder with no wife present, and 3.1% were non-families. 20.5% of all households were made up of individuals; 20.4% consisted of someone who was 65 years of age or older and living alone. The average household size was 2.4 and the average family size was 3.33.

The median age in the city was 39.7 years. 22.2% of residents were under the age of 18; 5.2% were between the ages of 18 and 24; 18.8% were from 25 to 44; 26.3% were from 45 to 64; and 27.5% were 65 years of age or older. The gender makeup of the city was 46.8% male and 53.2% female

Culture
For many years Loup City has proclaimed itself as the "Polish capital of Nebraska," due to a significant Polish population (see Polonia). "Polish Days" is an annual community event held on the first weekend of June. The town's Catholic church, Saint Josaphat's, features stained glass windows commemorating area families, most with Polish names. The windows were salvaged from the previous St. Josaphat's and date from the early 1900s.

The early Loup City settlement has been depicted in the 2014 movie The Homesman.

Notable people
 Edmund C. Jaeger – Desert ecologist and naturalist who taught at Riverside City College in Riverside, California for 30 years
 Richard Raymond – Prominent Nebraska doctor and Undersecretary in the Department of Agriculture during the George W. Bush Administration
 Charles H. Mohr – News correspondent during the Vietnam War and in the Middle East

References

Cities in Nebraska
Polish-American culture in Nebraska
Cities in Sherman County, Nebraska
County seats in Nebraska
Populated places established in 1871
1871 establishments in Nebraska